The Reverend Gordon Alfred Bradbery  (born 8 May 1951) is the Lord Mayor of Wollongong and a minister of the Uniting Church, though not active in ministry since 2011. Bradbery was re-elected for a three-year term as Lord Mayor on 9 September 2017.

Early life and background
Born and initially raised in Tamworth, Bradbery moved to Sydney and was schooled at Barnardos Children's Home in Normanhurst between the ages of 10 and 16; an experience Bradbery refers to "being raised at the school of hard knocks".

Pastoral ministry
After leaving school at age sixteen, Bradbery trained as a laboratory technician, and in 1971 joined the Uniting Church as a youth and children's welfare worker. After 14 years as a layman, Bradbery was ordained in 1985 into the Uniting Church ministry.

The majority of Bradbery's 25 years as an ordained minister was spent at the Wollongong Mission of the Uniting Church, known as the "Church on the Mall" in Crown St, Wollongong. In addition to his ministerial duties, Bradbery was also responsible for the Wollongong Community Care Centre that runs regular welfare programs for the disadvantaged, including a popular soup kitchen. Bradbery also worked actively with various elements of the community, adopting specialist areas in community development and social justice programs, as well as trauma and bereavement counselling. Bradbery has been recognised through numerous awards for his work with the disadvantaged, the traumatised and the vulnerable.

In addition to his work as a minister and in the community, Bradbery also undertook continued education, earning bachelor's degrees in psychology, sociology and divinity at the University of Sydney.

Following a meeting of the Presbytery of Illawarra of the Uniting Church, the decision was made not to extend Bradbery's term as the head of the Wollongong Mission beyond 2011, with the Chairman, David Jones citing "need to undertake succession planning for Ministry Leadership given the length of time Gordon has been in this placement". There was significant uproar among parts of the Wollongong community as a result of this decision, largely due to Bradbery's extensive community service work. Bradbery remains on the church's list of ordained ministers but, to use the church's terminology, is not in active placement.

Community service
Bradbery has held numerous positions outside his church ministry role, including:
 Chairperson of Lifeline South Coast for 15 years
 Police Chaplain – Wollongong Region for 14 years
 Rural Fire Service Chaplain and awarded 10 years service medal
 Police Commissioners Citation – Waterfall Train Disaster – for outstanding welfare assistance
 Interfaith Dialogue with the Muslim and Buddhist Communities
 Mental Health Advocate

Awards
In 1996, Bradbery was awarded the Medal of the Order of Australia, "in recognition of service to the community, particularly for his role during the 1994 Sydney bushfires and the subsequent relief efforts for those affected".

In 1996 and again in 2009, Bradbery was awarded Rotary International's Paul Harris Fellowship Medal for outstanding community service.

In 2018, Bradbery was awarded the Member of the Order of Australia, in recognition of his extensive community service including his service to local government.

References

1951 births
Living people
People from Tamworth, New South Wales
Independent politicians in Australia
Mayors and Lord Mayors of Wollongong
Uniting Church in Australia ministers
University of Sydney alumni
Members of the Order of Australia
Recipients of the Medal of the Order of Australia